Events from the year 1461 in France

Incumbents
 Monarch – Charles VII (until July 22), then Louis XI

Events

Births

Deaths

22 July – Charles VII of France (born 1403).

Full date missing
Jean Poton de Xaintrailles, noble (born 1390?)
Martin le Franc, poet (born c.1410)

See also

References

1460s in France